The Nayaks of Gingee (Senji) were rulers of the Gingee principality of Tamil Nadu between 16th to 18th century CE. They were subordinates of the imperial Vijayanagara emperors, and were appointed as provincial governors by the Vijayanagar Emperor who divided the Tamil country into three Nayakships viz., Madurai, Tanjore and Gingee. Later, after the fall of the Vijayanagara's Tuluva dynasty, the Gingee rulers declared independence. While they ruled independently, they were sometimes at war with the Tanjore neighbors and the Vijayanagara overlords later based in Vellore and Chandragiri.

The Nayaka Rulers clan
The Gingee Nayak line was established by Tubaki (aka Tupakula) Krishnappa Nayaka, the son of Koneri Nayaka and grandnephew of Achyutappa Nayaka. Sanjay  Subrahmanyam and Brennig provide the following details on Achyutappa Nayak:

{{quote|"...Achyutappa chetti, belonged to the Balija Chetti mercantile community, originally of Telugu extraction, but settled in the Tamil region as a part of the extensive migratory movement from the Andhra to the Tamil regions that began c.1350 and continued into our period. The family tree of Achyutappa – to the extent we are aware of it – was as follows: Siblings of Achyutappa: Achyutappa—Chinnana—Kesava—Brother(unknown)--Sister(unknown). Children of Kesava': Laksmana. Children of Achyutappa's Unknown Brother: Koneri—father of Krishnappa (the founder of Senji Nayaka kingdom).. }}

Some of the Nayakas in the Gingee line were:
 Krishnappa Nayaka (1509–1521)
 Chennappa Nayaka
 Gangama Nayaka
 Venkata Krishnappa Nayaka
 Venkata Rama Bhupaala Nayaka
 Thriyambamka Krishnappa Nayaka
 Varadappa Nayaka
 Ramalinga Nayani vaaru
 Venkata Perumal Naidu
 Periya Ramabhadra Naidu
 Ramakrishnappa Naidu (- 1649)

Srinivasachari takes chronicles mentioned in copper plate grants into account and mentions the following nayakas in the Gingee line, noting governorship of Gingee began in Saka era 1386 / CE 1464:
 1490 - Vaiyappa Nayak
 1490-1520 - Tubaki Krishnappa Nayaka (originally Bala / Vala Krishnappa who became Tubbaki / Dubakki / Dubala Krishnappa in local legends).
 1520-1540 - Achyuta Vijaya Ramachandra Nayak
 1540-1550 - Muthialu Nayak
 1570-1600 - Venkatappa Nayak
 1600-1620 - Varadappa Nayak
 Appa Nayak - up to Muslim conquest.

Territory
The Gingee Nayak kingdom when established covered most of Northern Tamil Nadu including the present day Chennai, Puducherry and vast areas of Nellore, Chittoor, Vellore and Chandragiri. Its Southern boundary extended up to Kollidam River which marked the boundary between the Tanjavur and Madurai kingdoms. Later, during mid 16th centuries, the Gingee Nayaks lost control of the Vellore Fort and its Northern provinces when their erstwhile Vijayanagara overlords under Aravidu Dynasty took possession of these places and re-established their later Kingdom.

Origins
Supposed origins
Two inscriptions from Thirupparankunram in Madurai giving a list of nayaks in Gingee state they migrated originally from Maninagapura in northern India to Vijayanagara and subsequently settled in Gingee under Vaiyappa Nayak. An inscription of Surappa Nayak of the Gingee line mentions him with the title of 'lord of Maninagapura'. Maninagapura is supposedly Manikhpur (near Allahabad, UP) with the immigration supposed to have taken place in 1370 AD. However, neither the cause of migration could be established nor any other evidence exists to prove they originally came from Maninagapura. Circumstances leading to the foundation of the Gingee governorship are also not ascertainable. As per legends in the Karnataka Rajakkal Savistara Charitam and Vaishnara Guruparampara'', the line was established around the time when Vedanta Desikan requested Gopanarya to restore the idol of Govindaraja Perumal which had been thrown out of the Chidambaram shrine. At that time the nayaks were possibly deputies of Saluva Narasinga. As per MacKenzie manuscripts Krishnadevaraya had around this time marched into Carnatic with his chief nayaks, who were Vaiyappa Nayaka, Tubbaki Krishnappa Nayaka and others; exercised his authority, and installed his second in command, Tubbaki Krishnappa Nayaka as the Gingee governor. The Jesuit traveler, Father Pimenta reportedly met Tubaki Krishnappa Nayaka when he was carrying out restoration works at the Chidambaram temple.

Historical time
In 1509, under the orders of Krishnadeva Raya, Vaiyappa Nayak led the Vijayanagar forces against the local chieftains of the Gingee area. Thereafter, Krishnadevaraya consolidated this area under one of his men, Tubakki (or Tupakula) Krishnappa Nayaka.

Sanjay Subrahmanya and Brennig note that Krishnappa was the son of Koneri who in turn was the son of an unnamed brother of Achyutappa Chetti. However, Burton Stein notes that Tubaki Krishnappa was the son of Vaiyappa Nayak, the Army General of Krishnadeva Raya. We can therefore surmise that either Koneri and Vaiyappa are the same person or that Vaiyappa was in some form related to the unnamed brother of Achyutappa Chetty. Krishnappa Nayaka established a heredity line of Nayak rulers who ruled Gingee from 1509 to 1648 AD. Krishnappa Nayaka reign lasted from 1507 to 1521.
`

Krishnappa's rule
Krishnappa Nayak is said to be the founder of Gingee city. The earlier name of Gingee was Krishnapura. Krishnappa Nayak built the Singavaram Venkataramana and Venugopalaswami temples and other structures inside the Gingee Fort. Krishnappa was said be a native of Conjivaram (Kanchipuram) and kept a flower-garden dedicated to the God, Varadaraj Perumal. The granaries of the Gingee Fort, the Kalyana Mahal and the thick walls enclosing the three hills of Gingee are attributed to Krishnappa Nayaka. Although Gingee had been a fortified centre as early as 1240 CE, it was during the rule of Krishnappa that the present layout of the Garh Mahal (fort) was established. Krishnappa is said to be the first Nayaka who converted a fort into an outstanding example of military architecture. Krishnappa Nayaka's rule was fraught with wars against the Muslims. Raghunatha Nayaka of Tanjore is said to have secured the release of Krishnappa Nayaka from the Muhammedans with the sanction of the Vijayanagar emperor. A grateful Krishnappa reportedly gave away his daughter in marriage to the Tanjore king.

Krishnappa's family
Krishnappa Nayaka came from a family of merchants. He was the grandnephew of Achyutappa Chetti who was a trader, a broker and a shipping merchant. Achyutappa's home-base was Devanampattinam of Cuddalore which he got fortified using his ties with the Nayakas and local militia leaders. Initially no more than a broker and an interpreter, by the 1620s Achyutappa's power as an independent merchant came to be on the rise, as was his standing in the elite politics of southern and central coromandel. He was aided by his brothers Chinanna, Kesava and an other unnamed brother. Achyutappa manoeuvered his quasi-diplomatic position by mediating in the internecine warfare of the 1620s between the poligar factions of Senji (Gingee) and Chingleput regions.

Achyutappa's quasi-diplomatic rise in status also emerged from his relations with the King of Arakan and Nayak of Madurai and even the Cochin ruler who used Achyutappa as an intermediary while attempting a rapprochement with the Dutch in the early 1630s. Acyutappa's main trade was shipping. He dominated the coromandel coast. Until 1634, the Dutch East India Company (Verenigde Oostindische Compagnie or VOC) was almost completely dependent on Achyutappa and his relatives for the supply of rice to provision company factories. Together with Chinnana, Koneri, Kesava and Laksmana, Tubaki Krishnappa Nayak owned the Coromadel Shipping, with Royal Shipping as a partner. The Royal Shipping was owned by the rulers of Ayutthaya, Arakan and Kedah of Southeast Asia.

However, Acyutappa's activities were diversified. By the 1620s, along with his brother Chinnana, Achyutappa had become increasingly involved in farming revenue in the territories of the Nayakas and the Chandragiri ruler. When Acyutappa died in Mar 1634, the mantle of VOC's chief broker of Coromandel fell on his brother Chinanna.

Chinnanna lived an exorbitant lifestyle with 40 wives and innumerable children. Chinanna was politically more ambitious than his brother, Achyutappa, with a penchant for diplomacy and even direct participation as a field general in internecine warfare of the 1630s. However, his abrasiveness led him to fall out with his own brother Kesava and his nephews Seshadra and Laksmana. By early 1638, the family feud led Kesava and Lakshmana to persuade Tubaki Krisnappa to take Koneri as a prisoner. Koneri fled and sought refuge under Chinanna. However, when faced with the superior force of Tubaki Krishnappa, Chinanna surrendered.

See also
 Madurai Nayak dynasty
 Thanjavur Nayak kingdom

References

External links
 Epigrāphiya Karnāṭaka (5,1): Hassan district 1: Hassan, Belur, Channarayapattana, Hole-Nasipur, Arkalgud, Manjavabad, Arsikere Taluks. Available from: http://idb.ub.uni-tuebingen.de/diglit/EC_05_1_1902/0929

Bibliography

Further reading
C. S. Srinivasachari, M. A., Professor of History, Annamalai University, History Of Gingee And Its Rulers (The University, 1943), ASIN: B0007JBT3G
Questioning Ramayanas – by Paula Richman
Velcheru Narayana Rao, David Shulman. Classical Telugu poetry: an anthology, Page 63.
B. S. Baliga. Tamil Nadu district gazetteers, page 427.

Dynasties of India
Telugu people
Hindu monarchs
Telugu monarchs
Tamil monarchs
Tamil Nadu under the Vijayanagar Empire
1509 establishments in Asia